Otto Weinkamm (13 February 1902 in Aschaffenburg – 27 January 1968 in Augsburg) was the mayor of Augsburg, Germany, in 1946. He was a member of the Christian Social Union of Bavaria and of the BVP. He represented the electoral district which covered the city in the Bundestag from 1957 to 1965.

References
 Biographical sketch of Otto Weinkamm 

1902 births
1968 deaths
Mayors of Augsburg
Bavarian People's Party politicians
Knights Commander of the Order of Merit of the Federal Republic of Germany
Ministers of the Bavaria State Government
Members of the Bundestag for Bavaria
Members of the Bundestag for the Christian Social Union in Bavaria